The Spanish Socialist Workers' Party of Andalusia (PSOE–A) is the Andalusian branch of the Spanish Socialist Workers' Party, as well as the largest and most important federation within the PSOE.

Formerly known as the Andalusian Socialist Federation (FSA), it was founded in 1977. The party was the ruling party of Andalusia uninterruptedly from 1978 to 2019, having won all regional elections in that time except for the 2012 election, after which it nonetheless was able to maintain the regional government through a coalition with United Left. It lost power for the first time after the 2018 election, when a PP-Cs coalition was formed. In the 2022 election, it worsened its already worst result ever.

Leaders

Presidents of Andalusia
Plácido Fernández Viagas, 1978–1979
Rafael Escuredo, 1979–1984
José Rodríguez de la Borbolla, 1984–1990
Manuel Chaves, 1990–2009
Gaspar Zarrías, 2009 (acting)
José Antonio Griñán, 2009–2013
Susana Díaz, 2013–2019

Party leaders
José Rodríguez de la Borbolla, 1977–1988
Carlos Sanjuán, 1999–1994
Manuel Chaves, 1994–2010
José Antonio Griñán, 2010–2013
Susana Díaz, 2013–2021
Juan Espadas, 2021–present

Electoral performance

Parliament of Andalusia

Cortes Generales

European Parliament

References

1977 establishments in Spain
Andalusia
Political parties established in 1977
Political parties in Andalusia
Social democratic parties in Spain